Anthony Liscio (July 2, 1940 – June 18, 2017) was an American football offensive tackle in the National Football League for the Dallas Cowboys. He played college football at the University of Tulsa.

Early years
Liscio attended Westinghouse High School, where he was an All-state end in football, the starting center in basketball and a shot putter for the track and field team. He was inducted into the Westinghouse High School Wall of Fame.

He went on to become a two-way starting tackle for the University of Tulsa. As a senior, he was moved to defensive end and was named All-Missouri Valley Conference, honorable-mention All-American and was invited to play in the College All-Star Game against the NFL champion.

In 2004, he was inducted into the University of Tulsa Athletics Hall of Fame. In 2015, he was inducted into the Second Pittsburgh City League Hall of Fame.

Professional career

Green Bay Packers
Liscio was selected by the Green Bay Packers in the third round (42nd overall) of the 1963 NFL Draft. He was also drafted by the New York Jets in the tenth round (75th overall) of the 1963 AFL Draft.

He signed with the Packers, and during training camp he was used as a defensive end and defensive tackle. He was eventually released the week of the season opener on September 10.

Dallas Cowboys (first stint)
Liscio was claimed off waivers by the Dallas Cowboys, who switched him to offense, and named him the starter at left tackle (five starts) at the end of his rookie season. He became a stalwart on the Cowboys offensive line for almost a decade and was only the second player in franchise history to hold this position after replacing Bob Fry.

In 1964, Liscio started 10 games before being placed on the injured reserve list with a right knee injury. He lost all of the 1965 season after suffering complications (staph infection) from an offseason knee surgery. In 1966, he recovered enough to resume his career, was named starting left guard (10 starts), and eventually moved back to left tackle (four starts) at the end of the season. The next year, he played in the 1967 NFL Championship Game, famously known as the "Ice Bowl". In 1970, he played in only 11 games (seven starts) because of back problems.

During his first eight seasons, Liscio helped Dallas reach two NFC Championships and one Super Bowl, while playing in 89 games, many of them with injuries.

On May 19, 1971, he was sent to the San Diego Chargers as part of the “Bambi” trade that brought Hall of Famer Lance Alworth to the Cowboys.

San Diego Chargers
Liscio never played a game for the Chargers because of injuries to his back and hamstrings. On September 8, 1971, he was traded to the Miami Dolphins along with a fourth round draft choice (#91-Larry Ball) in exchange for center Carl Mauck.

Miami Dolphins
Liscio never played a game for the Miami Dolphins either, because he announced his retirement after the trade became official, rather than reporting to the team.

Dallas Cowboys (second stint)
In mid-November 1971, Tom Landry called Liscio on Monday November 15 to ask if he could return to the Cowboys to replace injured teammates. Liscio reported to the team on Wednesday to start at left tackle against the Washington Redskins on Sunday.

During the game, Liscio played with injuries to his shoulders and knees. Liscio and the Cowboys won the game 13-0 and became the leader in the NFC East. At Super Bowl VI, the Cowboys defeated Miami 24-3. In that game, Liscio successfully blocked Bill Stanfill, helping Duane Thomas and other running backs register 252 rushing yards. Liscio retired after being the runner-up for the NFL Comeback Player of the Year Award.

Personal life
After football, he worked in commercial real estate. In 2012, he suffered a heart attack while being present at the Dallas Cowboys training camp.

Liscio died on June 18, 2017, at age 76 at his Lake Highlands home. He was diagnosed with amyotrophic lateral sclerosis after falling and breaking his hip in mid-2016 and began slurring his words. He had lost his ability to speak and required a feeding tube, according to his wife, Annette, to whom he was married since 1963. She believed playing football had contributed to his condition and, upon his death, donated his brain to be tested for chronic traumatic encephalopathy. He was survived by her and their three children.

References

External links
Luring Tony Liscio out of retirement paid off for Liscio and Cowboys
Trading wasn't always so difficult in the NFL
Tulsa Hurricanes bio

1940 births
2017 deaths
American football offensive tackles
Players of American football from Pittsburgh
Tulsa Golden Hurricane football players
Dallas Cowboys players
Neurological disease deaths in Texas
Deaths from motor neuron disease